Rafał Królikowski (born 27 December 1966, Zduńska Wola) is a Polish film, television and theatre actor.

Life and career
He was born on 27 December 1966 in Zduńska Wola. In 1992, he graduated from the National Academy of Dramatic Art in Warsaw. He made his film debut in Andrzej Wajda's 1992 film Pierścionek z orłem w koronie (The Crowned-Eagle Ring) for which he was awarded the Zbigniew Cybulski Award for best young actor. Other notable films that he appeared in include Paweł Komorowski's 2000 film Syzyfowe prace (The Labors of Sisyphus), a film adaptation of Stefan Żeromski's novel of the same name; Andrzej Wajda's 2002 film The Revenge which is a film adaptation of Aleksander Fredro's drama Zemsta; and Władysław Pasikowski's 2019 film Kurier, which tells the story of journalist and resistance fighter Jan Nowak-Jeziorański.

Apart from his film roles, he also appeared in numerous TV series such as  M jak miłość, Hotel 52, Na dobre i na złe, Prawo Agaty and Ojciec Mateusz.

His career in theatre involves collaborating with such theatres as Zygmunt Hubner Theatre, the Polish Theatre and the Warsaw Chamber Opera.

Personal life
In 1995 he married Dorota Mirska with whom he has two sons: Piotr (born 1998) and Michał (born 2002).

Filmography
1992: Pierścionek z orłem w koronie as Marcin and Andrzej
1993: 20 lat później as Wolf Hauser (Karl Klepacz)
1993: Pożegnanie z Marią as Skrzypek
1994: Legenda Tatr as Andrzej
1995: Dzieje mistrza Twardowskiego as Balan devil
1997: Klan as Janusz Sowiński (cameo)
1997: Przystań as Jan
1998: Syzyfowe prace as Albert (episode 3)
1999: Miodowe lata as the boss (episode 18)
1999: Palce lizać as Rysio Wiatr
2000: Syzyfowe prace as Albert, friend of the Płoniewicz family
2000: Na dobre i na złe as Tadeusz Świderski, Michał's father (episode 38)
2001: Przeprowadzki as Franciszek Flatau (episode 9)
2001: Garderoba damska as Wiesiek (episode 9)
2001: The Hexer as King Niedamir
2001-2002: M jak miłość as Konrad Badecki
2003: Superprodukcja as Yanek Drzazga
2002: The Revenge as Wacław
2002: The Hexer as King Niedamir (episode 4)
2003: Ciało as Wolter
2003: Psie serce as Tomek, Anna's boyfriend (episode 10)
2004: Trzeci as the Toyota guy
2004: Talki z resztą as Kazik
2004: Nigdy w życiu! as editor-in-chief
2005-2006: Tango z aniołem as Mikołaj Brzozowski
2005-2008: Egzamin z życia as Radek Drawski
2006-2007: Pogoda na piątek as Artur Kaliski
2007: Ryś as Garnitur
2007-2008: Niania as Maks's brother
2008: Hotel pod żyrafą i nosorożcem as Miłobędzki, Ola's father
2008: Lejdis as Tomek
2008: Teraz albo nigdy! as Michał
2008: Kochaj i tańcz as a journalist
2010-2013: Hotel 52 as concierge Michał Horwat
2011: Usta usta as Marek
2012: Prawo Agaty as Marcin Kos (episode 17)
2012: Być jak Kazimierz Deyna as editor-in-chief
2013: Komisarz Alex as professor Marek Antoniewicz (episode 39)
2013: Podejrzani zakochani as Stanisław Tarkowski vel Alex Braun and Oleg Kaługin
2014: Sama słodycz as Dziubek, partner Marty (episodes 3 and 13)
2014: Czas honoru. Powstanie as Ernst von Hackel, Obergruppenführer Waffen-SS
2014: O mnie się nie martw as Artur Ostrowski (episodes 7-9)
2015: Ojciec Mateusz as professor Bartosz Feldrecht (episode 174)
2016: Druga szansa as Jakub Zeit
2017: Marszałek as Bolesław Wieniawa-Długoszowski
2019: Kurier'' as General Stanisław Tatar

See also
Polish cinema
Polish Film Awards

References

1966 births
Living people
Polish male actors
Polish male television actors
People from Zduńska Wola
Aleksander Zelwerowicz National Academy of Dramatic Art in Warsaw alumni